Langeland Bridge (Danish, Langelandsbroen) is a road bridge that connects the islands Langeland and Siø. From Siø a connection exists via Tåsinge to Funen.
It was built from 1960 to 1962.

Dimensions 
The Langeland Bridge is 771 metres long and 15 m metres wide. The longest span is 91 metres, and the maximum clearance to the sea is 26 metres.

See also
List of bridges in Denmark

External links

The Langeland Bridge - Highways-Denmark.com

Bridges in Denmark
Arch bridges in Denmark
Beam bridges in Denmark
Road bridges in Denmark
Bridges completed in 1962
1962 establishments in Denmark